The Colorado State Bar Association (CBA), founded in 1897, is a voluntary bar association for the state of Colorado. There are 26 local bars within the organization. The CBA works for the common interests of attorneys and judges and is a non-profit organization. It has 30 sections and 18 committees which cover diverse specialties of the law. Each section offers members a closer association with other professionals engaged in a similar legal specialty.   

Colorado's attorneys are licensed and disciplined by the Colorado Supreme Court. The court's attorney regulation system, funded by attorney registration fees, polices the profession. In addition, the court oversees the State Court Administrator, Board of Continuing Legal Education, Board of Law Examiners, Commission on Judicial Discipline, and Unauthorized Practice of Law Committee.  

Perhaps the earliest bar association in what is now Colorado was the Weld County Bar Association, founded by three lawyers in or after 1870. 

A 21-member board of governors is elected on an annual basis, except for an executive director, who is hired by the board itself.

Colorado is one of the few voluntary states, where attorneys do not need to belong to practice law.

The Bar provides opportunities for continuing education, volunteering, and networking for those in the legal profession while upholding the standards of the bar. Likewise, the Bar works to secure efficient administration of justice, encourage the adoption of proper legislation and perpetuate the history of the profession and the memory of its members. 

The headquarters are located in Denver, Colorado.

CBA is the publisher of a bi-monthly journal, The Colorado Lawyer.

Continuing Legal Education in Colorado, Inc. (known as “Colorado Bar Association CLE”) and the Colorado Bar Foundation share names with the CBA and are related, but are separate entities with separate governing boards. They are not within the scope of this plan. Though separate processes, these organizations may engage in strategic planning and consider better alignment with the CBA.

The Colorado Bar Association CLE 
CLE in Colorado, Inc. (Colorado Bar Association CLE) is the nonprofit educational arm of the Colorado Bar Association and the Denver Bar Association. They produce high-quality continuing legal education programs and legal publications at competitive prices, with substantial member discounts. They are self-supporting and receive no membership dues from the CBA or DBA. Their income derives from program registration fees and from sales of books, homestudy courses, and course manuals. Every year, hundreds of Colorado lawyers and judges volunteer their time and expertise to help them produce these educational resources for our members. Without this generous contribution of talent, Colorado Bar Association CLE could not fulfill its mission.

The Colorado Bar Foundation 
The Colorado Bar Foundation was established in 1953 by CBA members. It functions exclusively for educational and charitable purposes. The Foundation provides grants to help educate the general public and provide assistance to the State’s legal institutions. Financial support from the Bar comes in part from voluntary contributions solicited by members, annual dues, memorial contributions, bequests made in wills, special gifts, and CBA fellows. This financial support is used in the Colorado Bar Foundation Grant Program, which supports statewide, regional, or local projects with demonstrated community need.

References

External links
 University of Denver Law Review
 University of Colorado School of Law
 Colorado Law

American state bar associations
Organizations established in 1897
1897 establishments in Colorado
Colorado law